Suma-Ahenkro  is a town in the Bono Region of Ghana. It is the capital town of Suma Traditional area.  The town is known for the Sumaman Senior High School. The Suma Traditional Area is one of the notable traditional areas in the Bono Region of Ghana. It is one of the core states of the traditional Gyaaman Kingdom that exist in parts of the Republics of Ghana and La Côte d'Ivoire. Administratively the traditional area is located in the Jaman (Gyaaman) North District of the Bono Region. There are many tourist attractions in the Suma area. These include festivals and other traditional ceremonies, music and dance, ancient relics, artifacts and historical sites.

School.  The school is a second cycle institution.

References

Populated places in the Bono Region